Oxyconger leptognathus, the Shorttail pike conger, is an eel in the family Muraenesocidae.  It is the only member of its genus.  It is found in the western Pacific Ocean from Japan to Australia.

References

Muraenesocidae
Fish described in 1858